The 97th Jäger Division was a light infantry Division of the German Army during World War II. It can trace its origins to the 97th Light Infantry Division which was formed in December 1940. It was then redesignated the 97th Jäger Division in July 1942.
It fought in the Battle of Kursk and suffered heavy losses. It was then transferred to the lower Dnieper river area and fought well during the retreat through Ukraine. It was transferred to Slovakia in October 1944 and surrendered to the Red Army near Deutschbrod in May 1945.

Background
The main purpose of the German Jäger Divisions was to fight in adverse terrain where smaller, coordinated units were more facilely combat-capable than the brute force offered by the standard infantry divisions. The Jäger divisions were more heavily equipped than mountain divisions, but not as well armed as a larger infantry division. In the early stages of the war, they were the interface divisions fighting in rough terrain and foothills as well as urban areas, between the mountains and plains. The Jägers (hunters in German), relied on a high degree of training and slightly superior communications, as well as their not inconsiderable artillery support. In the middle stages of the war, as the standard infantry divisions were downsized, the Jäger structure of divisions with two infantry regiments became the standard table of organization.

In 1943, Adolf Hitler declared that all infantry divisions were now Grenadier Divisions except for his elite Jäger and Mountain Jäger divisions.

Commanders 
Generaloberst Walter Weiß   (15 December 1940 – 15 January 1941)
General der Infanterie Sigismund von Förster   (15 January 1941 – 15 April 1941)
General der Artillerie Maximilian Fretter-Pico   (15 April 1941 – 27 December 1941)
Generalleutnant Ernst Rupp   (1 January 1942 – 30 May 1943)
Generalmajor Friedrich-Wilhelm Otte   (30 May 1943 – 3 June 1943)
General der Infanterie Ludwig Müller   (3 June 1943 – 12 December 1943)
Generalleutnant Friedrich-Carl Rabe von Pappenheim   (13 December 1943 – 17 April 1945)
Generalmajor Robert Bader   (17 April 1945 – 8 May 1945)

Area of operations

As 97th Light Division
Germany (Dec 1940 – June 1941)
Eastern front, southern sector (June 1941 – July 1942)
As 97th Jäger Division
Eastern front, southern sector (July 1942 – October 1944)
Slovakia (October 1944 – May 1945)  see: Battle of the Dukla Pass

Order of battle 
Jäger Regiment 204
Jäger Regiment 207
Reconnaissance Battalion 97
Artillerie Regiment 81
Pionier Battalion 97
Panzerjäger Battalion 97
Signals Battalion 97
Feldersatz Battalion 81
Versorgungseinheiten 97 
Schlächterei-Kompanie 97

References

Further reading
Ernst Ludwig Ott – Die Spielhahnjäger 1940–1945: Bilddokumentation der 97. Jäger Division (German)
Ernst Ott – Jäger am Feind: Geschichte und Opfergang der 97.Jäger Division 1940–1945 (German)
Ernst Ludwig Ott – Spielhahnjäger tapfer und Pflichtbewußt bis zum Ende: Fortsetzung bzw. Ergänzung der Div.Geschichte der 97. Jäger Division (German)

External links 
 Photographs from personnel of Schlächterei-Kompanie 97 on the Eastern Front

Jäger Divisions
Military units and formations established in 1940
Military units and formations disestablished in 1945